Qurbani can refer to:
 Qurbani (film), a 1980 Bollywood film
 Qurban (Islamic ritual sacrifice), an animal sacrifice